The Doshan Tappeh Street is a painting by the Iranian realism painter Kamal-ol-molk with oil on cotton duck. It was painted in 1899 and features ex-street Doshan Tappeh in Tehran. A lady in Qajar-fashion is walking in the middle of work, along the street.

Sources
 Biography and works of Kamal-ol-molk (in Persian language)
 commons.wikimedia.org commons.wikimedia

Paintings by Kamal-ol-molk
1899 paintings
Modern paintings
Paintings in Iran